The North Carolina High School Athletic Association (NCHSAA) is the governing organization of high school athletics in North Carolina, United States. The association maintains the official rule books and governs the officiating standards across the state.

The NCHSAA organizes member schools into conferences and oversees the state championships for each of the sanctioned sports.  The NCHSAA headquarters is located at 222 Finley Golf Course Road, in Chapel Hill, North Carolina.  The mailing address for the NCHSAA is PO Box 3216, Chapel Hill, North Carolina 27515.

History 
The NCHSAA was founded in 1913 by Dr. Louis Round Wilson, a professor at the University of North Carolina at Chapel Hill. The university served as the primary source of funding and leadership for the Association from 1913 through 1947, before the organization adopted its current model, which provides school administrators with direct influence through the presence of the NCHSAA Board of Directors. The NCHSAA remained affiliated with UNC until 2010, when it became an independent organization.

The first state playoffs were held in the NCHSAA's inaugural year of 1913, in both football and track. Baseball (1914), basketball (1915), and tennis (1916) were added over the next three athletic seasons. The organization has sanctioned a variety of different sports throughout its history, including: soccer (1927), wrestling (1931), golf (1937), swimming (1950), cross country (1956), softball (1975), volleyball (1976), indoor track (1987), and lacrosse (2010). Women's sports were first sanctioned in 1968, with women's golf being the first sport having an NCHSAA championship.

Classifications 
The high schools within the state have been organized (since 1929) into classifications based by the size of the student population. Prior to 1929 all schools played in a single "open" format and postseason play was decided within "east" and "west" regions by meetings of school administrators. The east versus west postseason approach continues to this day. In 1929 the NCHSAA first split schools into "Class A" and "Class B," generally by school size.

In December 1929, in the Piedmont and western foothills region of the state, 16 charter member high schools formed the Western North Carolina High School Activities Association (WNCHSAA). This association grew to as many as 42 high schools and four different conferences. The WNCHSAA schools merged into the NCHSAA in 1977.

The NCHSAA, due to segregation, also did not include African American high schools. These historically black high schools competed in the North Carolina High School Athletics Conference (NCHSAC) and would start to merge into the NCHSAA in 1967.

Several other changes occurred to NCHSAA classifications between 1929 and 1958, which eventually went to three classifications. In 1959 due to significant growth and consolidation of North Carolina high schools, member schools were split into four classifications, identified by 1A, 2A, 3A, & 4A. The states 4A class is made up of the largest high schools, and 1A the smallest. These four classes have remained as the different classification sizes of North Carolina high schools to the current day.

Prior to 1993, a set minimum enrollment number delineated each school's classification. In 1993, schools were split so that approximately 25% of the schools were in each of the four classifications. A new approach was instituted in 2017, known as the 20-30-30-20 model, with the largest 20% in the 4A classification and the smallest 20% in the 1A classification. The middle 60% was split between 2A and 3A. This model received considerable criticism for the unbalanced classes, and the NCHSAA moved back to the 25-25-25-25 model in 2021. The classifications and conferences of each school are assessed every four years based on updated student population numbers.

All NCHSAA sanctioned sports have a separate state championship competition and title for each of the 1A, 2A, 3A and 4A classifications. The only exceptions are sports in which the 1A and 2A classifications are combined (in some instances 1A, 2A, and 3A have been combined). In football, starting in 2002, each classification was separated into a single "A" and double "AA" classification, with the double "AA" classification being made up of larger schools than the single "A". Classes were 1A, 1AA, 2A, 2AA, 3A, 3AA, 4A and 4AA for football only. This single "A" and double "AA" format lasted until the fall of 2021, when the NCHSAA went back to football being only 1A, 2A, 3A, and 4A class sizes.

There are a number of different high school conferences throughout the state for local play. Many conferences are grouped with high schools all being in the same classification, with some conferences consisting of schools from two different classifications.

Sports 
The NCHSAA sanctions the following sports: Baseball, Basketball, Cross Country, Football, Golf, Track and Field, Lacrosse, Soccer, Softball, Swimming, Tennis, Cheerleading, Volleyball, and Wrestling.

Many North Carolina schools, particularly in larger metropolitan areas, have programs in field hockey, girls and boys beach volleyball,  and gymnastics, but these sports are currently not sanctioned by the NCHSAA.

Conferences
These are the conference alignments starting with the 2021–2022 school year. With minor adjustments to accommodate new schools, these alignments will remain through the 2024–2025 school year.

4A

CAP 6
All schools located in Raleigh, North Carolina
Athens Drive High School, "Jaguars"
Needham B. Broughton High School, "Capitals"
Cardinal Gibbons High School, "Crusaders"
William G. Enloe High School, "Eagles"
Leesville Road High School, "Pride"
Jesse O. Sanderson High School, "Spartans"

Central Piedmont
Schools located in Davie and Forsyth counties
Davie County High School, "War Eagles"
East Forsyth High School, "Eagles"
Robert B. Glenn High School, "Bobcats"
Mount Tabor High School, "Spartans"
Parkland Magnet High School, "Mustangs"
Ronald W. Reagan High School, "Raiders"
Richard J. Reynolds High School, "Demons"
West Forsyth High School, "Titans"

DAC-VII
Schools located in Durham, Orange, and Alamance Counties
Chapel Hill High School, "Tigers"
East Chapel Hill High School, "Wildcats"
Hillside High School, "Hornets"
Charles E. Jordan High School, "Falcons"
Northern High School, "Knights" (men), "Ladies" (women)
Riverside High School (Durham), "Pirates"
Southern Alamance High School, "Patriots"

Greater Neuse River
Schools located southern Wake County and northern Johnston County
Corinth Holders High School, "Pirates"
Clayton High School, "Comets"
Cleveland High School, "Rams"
Fuquay-Varina High School, "Bengals"
Garner Magnet High School, "Trojans"
South Garner High School, "Titans"
Southeast Raleigh High School, "Bulldogs"
Willow Spring High School, "Storm"

Greater Metro
Schools located along the I-85 corridor north of Charlotte
A. L. Brown High School, "Wonders"
Cox Mill High School, "Chargers"
Hickory Ridge High School, "Ragin' Bulls"
Lake Norman High School, "Wildcats"
Mooresville High School, "Blue Devils"
South Iredell High School, "Vikings"
West Cabarrus High School, "Wolverines"

Metro
Schools located in Guilford County
Grimsley High School, "Whirlies"
Northern Guilford High School, "Nighthawks"
Northwest Guilford High School, "Vikings"
Walter Hines Page Senior High School, "Pirates"
Ragsdale High School, "Flying Tigers"
Southeast Guilford High School, "Falcons"
Southwest Guilford High School, "Cowboys" (men), "Cowgirls" (women)
Western Guilford High School, "Hornets"

Northern Athletic
Schools located in northern Wake County
Heritage High School, "Huskies"
Knightdale High School, "Knights"
Millbrook High School, "Wildcats"
Rolesville High School, "Rams"
Wake Forest High School, "Cougars"
Wakefield High School, "Wolverines"

South Meck
Schools located in Mecklenburg County
Ardrey Kell High School, "Knights"
Phillip O. Berry Academy of Technology, "Cardinals"
Harding University High School, "Rams"
Myers Park High School, "Mustangs"
Olympic High School, "Trojans"
South Mecklenburg High School, "Sabres"

Southern Carolina
Schools located in Union County
Cuthbertson High School, "Cavaliers"
Marvin Ridge High School, "Mavericks"
Piedmont High School, "Panthers"
Porter Ridge High School, "Pirate"
Sun Valley High School, "Spartans"
Weddington High School, "Warriors"

Southwest Wake
Schools located in southwestern Wake County
Apex High School, "Cougars"
Apex Friendship High School, "Patriots"
Cary High School, "Imps"
Green Hope High School, "Falcons"
Green Level High School, "Gators"
Holly Springs High School, "Golden Hawks"
Middle Creek High School, "Mustangs"
Panther Creek High School, "Catamounts"

Southwestern
Schools located in Mecklenburg and Union counties
David W. Butler High School, "Bulldogs"
Charlotte Catholic High School, "Cougars"
East Mecklenburg High School, "Eagles"
Garinger High School, "Wildcats"
Independence High School, "Patriots"
Providence High School, "Panthers"
Rocky River High School, "Ravens"

3A–4A

All American Conference

Schools are located in Cumberland and Harnett County Areas

Overhills High School (4A), "Jaguars"
Pine Forest High School (4A), "Trojans"
E. E. Smith High School (3A), "Golden Bulls"
Harnett Central High School (3A), "Trojans"
Terry Sanford High School (3A), "Bulldogs"
Triton High School (3A), "Hawks"
Western Harnett High School (3A), "Eagles"
Westover High School (3A), "Wolverines"

Big East

Schools located in the central-eastern portion of the state.

D. H. Conley High School (4A), "Vikings"
New Bern High School (4A), "Bears"
Havelock High School (3A), "Rams"
Jacksonville High School (4A), "Cardinals"
Northside High School (Jacksonville) (3A), "Monarchs"
Junius H. Rose High School (3A), "Rampants"
South Central High School (3A), "Falcons"

Mideastern

Schools are located in the southeastern corner of the state.

Eugene Ashley High School (4A), "Screaming Eagles"
John T. Hoggard High School (4A), "Vikings"
Emsley A. Laney High School (4A), "Buccaneers"
New Hanover High School (4A), "Wildcats"
Topsail High School (4A), "Pirates"
North Brunswick High School (3A), "Scorpions"
South Brunswick High School (3A), "Cougars"
West Brunswick High School (3A), "Trojans"

Mountain

Schools located in Asheville and surrounding communities
A. C. Reynolds High School (4A), "Rockets"
Asheville High School (4A), "Cougars"
McDowell High School (4A), "Titans"
T. C. Roberson High School (4A), "Rams"
Enka High School (3A), "Jets"
Clyde A. Erwin High School (3A), "Warriors"
North Buncombe High School (3A), "Black Hawks"

Northwestern

Schools are located in the foothills and high country areas of northwestern part of state.
Alexander Central High School (4A), "Cougars"
South Caldwell High School (4A), "Spartans"
Watauga High School (4A), "Pioneers"
Ashe County High School (3A), "Huskies"
Freedom High School (3A), "Patriots"
Hibriten High School (3A), "Panthers"

Queen City

Schools located in Charlotte

Hopewell High School, "Titans" (4A)
William A. Hough High School, "Huskies" (4A)
Mallard Creek High School, "Mavericks" (4A)
North Mecklenburg High School, "Vikings" (4A)
Julius L. Chambers High School, "Cougars" (4A)
West Charlotte High School, "Lions" (3A)
West Mecklenburg High School, "Hawks" (3A)

Sandhills

Schools located in the Sandhills region of the state

Hoke County High School (4A), "Bucks"
Pinecrest High School (4A), "Patriots"
Richmond Senior High School (4A), "Raiders"
Lee County High School (3A), "Yellow Jackets"
Scotland High School (3A), "Scots"
Southern Lee High School (3A), "Cavaliers"
Union Pines High School (3A), "Vikings"

United 8

Schools located in the Fayetteville and surrounding areas

Jack Britt High School (4A), "Buccaneers"
Gray's Creek High School (4A), "Bears"
Lumberton High School (4A), "Pirates"
South View High School (4A), "Tigers"
Purnell Swett High School (4A), "Rams"
Douglas Byrd High School (3A), "Eagles"
Cape Fear High School (3A), "Colts"
Seventy-First High School (3A), "Falcons"

3A

Big South
Schools located in Cleveland and Gaston counties
Ashbrook High School, "Green Wave"
Crest High School, "Chargers"
Forestview High School, "Jaguars"
Hunter Huss High School, "Huskies"
Kings Mountain High School, "Mountaineers"
North Gaston High School, "Wildcats"
Stuart W. Cramer High School, "Storm"
South Point High School, "Red Raiders"

Central
Schools located in the north-central portion of the state
Cedar Ridge High School, "Red Wolves"
Eastern Alamance High School, "Eagles"
Northwood High School, "Chargers"
Orange High School, "Panthers"
Person High School, "Rockets"
Western Alamance High School, "Warriors"
Walter M. Williams High School, "Bulldogs"

Coastal

Schools located along the Southeastern coast of North Carolina
Croatan High School, "Cougars"
Dixon High School, "Bulldogs"
Richlands High School, "Wildcats"
Swansboro High School, "Pirates"
West Carteret High School, "Patriots"
White Oak High School, "Vikings"

Mountain 7
Schools located in the western North Carolina mountains
East Henderson High School, "Eagles"
Franklin High School, "Panthers"
North Henderson High School, "Knights"
Pisgah High School, "Black Bears"
Smoky Mountain High School, "Mustangs"
Tuscola High School, "Mountaineer"
West Henderson High School, "Falcons"

Mid-Piedmont
Schools located in Davidson, Montgomery, and Randolph counties
Asheboro High School, "Blue Comets"
Central Davidson High School, "Spartans"
Ledford Senior High School, "Panthers"
Montgomery Central High School, "Wolverines"
North Davidson High School, "Black Knights"
Oak Grove High School, "Grizzlies"

Mid-State
Schools located in Guilford, Rockingham, andForsyth counties
Simon G. Atkins Academic & Technology High School, "Camels"
James B. Dudley High School, "Panthers"
Eastern Guilford High School, "Wildcats"
High Point Central High School, "Bison"
Northeast Guilford High School, "Rams"
Rockingham County High School, "Cougars"
Ben L. Smith High School, "Golden Eagles"
Southern Guilford High School, "Storm"

Quad County
Schools located in Johnston, Wake, Wayne and Wilson counties
Charles B. Aycock High School, "Golden Falcons"
East Wake High School, "Warriors"
Ralph L. Fike High School, "Demons"
James B. Hunt Jr. High School, "Warriors"
Smithfield-Selma High School, "Spartans"
South Johnston High School, "Trojans"
Southern Wayne High School, "Saints"
West Johnston High School, "Wildcats"

South Piedmont
Schools located in Mecklenburg, Cabarrus, and Rowan counties.
Jesse C. Carson High School, "Cougars"
Central Cabarrus High School, "Vikings"
Concord High School, "Spiders"
East Rowan High School, "Mustangs"
Lake Norman Charter School, "Knights"
Northwest Cabarrus High School, "Trojans"
South Rowan High School, "Raiders"
West Rowan High School, "Falcons"

Western Foothills
Schools located in Catawba, Iredell, and Lincoln counties
East Lincoln High School, "Mustangs"
Fred T. Foard High School, "Tigers"
Hickory High School, "Red Tornadoes"
North Iredell High School, "Raiders"
North Lincoln High School, "Knights"
St. Stephens High School, "Indians"
Statesville High School, "Greyhounds"
West Iredell High School, "Warriors"

2A–3A

The Big East
Schools located in Franklin, Nash, and Halifax counties
Franklinton High School (3A), "Rams"
Northern Nash High School (3A), "Knights"
Rocky Mount High School (3A), "Gryphons"
Southern Nash High School (3A), "Firebirds"
Bunn High School (2A), "Wildcats"
Louisburg High School (2A), "Warriors"
Nash Central High School (2A), "Bulldogs"
Roanoke Rapids High School (2A), "Yellow Jackets"

Northeastern Coastal
Schools located in the northeastern corner of North Carolina
Camden County High School (3A), "Bruins"
Currituck County High School (3A), "Knights"
First Flight High School (3A), "Nighthawks"
Hertford County High School (2A), "Bears"
John A. Holmes High School (2A), "Aces"
Manteo High School (2A), "Redskins"
Northeastern High School (2A), "Eagles"
Pasquotank County High School (2A), "Panthers"

Northern Lakes
Located in the north-central portion of the state
Carrboro High School (3A), "Jaguars"
Durham School of the Arts (3A), "Bulldogs"
Southern High School (3A), "Spartans"
Vance County High School (3A), (Vipers)
Granville Central High School (2A), "Panthers"
South Granville High School (2A), "Vikings"
J.F. Webb High School (2A), "Warriors"

Rocky River
Schools in the south-central portion of the state
Central Academy of Technology and Arts (3A), "Cougars"
Parkwood High School (3A), "Rebels"
Anson High School (2A), "Bearcats"
Forest Hills High School (2A), "Yellow Jackets"
Monroe High School (2A), "Redhawks"
West Stanly High School (2A), "Colts"

2A

Catawba Valley Athletic
Schools located in Caldwell, Lincoln, and Burke counties
Bandys High School, "Trojans"
Bunker Hill High School, "Bears"
East Burke High School, "Cavaliers"
Lincolnton High School, "Wolves"
Maiden High School, "Blue Devils"
Newton-Conover High School, "Red Devils"
West Caldwell High School, "Warriors"
West Lincoln High School, "Rebels"

East Central
Schools located in Duplin, Lenoir, and Onslow counties
East Duplin High School, "Panthers"
James Kenan High School, "Tigers"
Kinston High School, "Vikings"
North Lenoir High School, "Hawks"
South Lenoir High School, "Blue Devils"
Southwest Onslow High School, "Stallions"
Wallace-Rose Hill High School, "Bulldogs"

Eastern Plains
Schools located in the Pitt, Edgecomb, Greene, and Craven counties
Ayden-Grifton High School, "Chargers"
Farmville Central High School, "Jaguars"
Greene Central High School, "Rams"
North Pitt High School, "Panthers"
Southwest Edgecombe High School, "Cougars"
Washington High School, "Pam Pack"
West Craven High School, "Eagles"

Foothills
Schools located in Surry and Wilkes counties
East Surry High School, "Cardinals"
Forbush High School, "Falcons"
North Surry High School, "Greyhounds"
North Wilkes High School, "Vikings"
Surry Central High School, "Golden Eagles"
West Wilkes High School, "Blackhawks"
Wilkes Central High School, "Eagles"

Mid-State
Schools located in Stokes and Rockingham counties
T. Wingate Andrews High School, "Red Raiders"
Dalton L. McMichael High School, "Phoenix"
John Motley Morehead High School, "Panthers"
North Forsyth High School, "Vikings"
Reidsville High School, "Rams"
Walkertown High School, "Wolfpack"
West Stokes High School, "Wildcats"

Mountain Foothills 7
Schools located in the southwestern corner of the state
Brevard High School, "Blue Devils"
Chase High School, "Trojans"
East Rutherford High School, "Cavaliers"
Hendersonville High School, "Bearcats"
R.L. Patton High School, "Panthers"
Polk County High School, "Wolverines"
R–S Central High School, "Hilltoppers"

Neuse 6
Schools in Johnston, Wilson, and Wayne counties
Beddingfield High School, "Bruins"
Eastern Wayne High School, "Warriors"
Goldsboro High School, "Cougars"
North Johnston High School, "Panthers"
Princeton High School, "Bulldogs"
Spring Creek High School, "Gators"

Southeastern Athletic
Schools located in Sampson, Robeson, and Bladen counties
Clinton High School, "Dark Horses"
East Bladen High School, "Eagles"
Fairmont High School, "Golden Tornadoes"
Midway High School, "Raiders"
Red Springs High School, "Red Devils"
St. Pauls High School, "Bulldogs"
West Bladen High School, "Knights"

1A–2A

Catawba Shores Athletic
Schools located in Davidson, Lincoln, Iredell, and Mecklenburg counties
Community School of Davidson (2A), "Spartans"
Lincoln Charter School (2A), "Eagles"
Pine Lake Preparatory (2A), "Pride"
Christ The King Catholic High School (1A), "Crusaders"
Langtree Charter Academy (1A), "Lions"
Mountain Island Charter School (1A), "Raptors"

Coastal Plains
Schools located along North Carolina's central coast
East Carteret High School (2A), "Mariners"
Jones Senior High School (1A), "Trojans"
Northside High School (Pinetown) (1A), "Panthers"
Lejeune High School (1A), "Devilpups"
Pamlico County High School (1A), "Hurricanes"
Southside High School (1A), "Seahawks"

Central Carolina
Schools located along the I-85 corridor
East Davidson High School (2A), "Golden Eagles"
Lexington Senior High School (2A), "Yellow Jackets"
Salisbury High School (2A), "Hornets"
West Davidson High School (2A), "Dragons"
North Rowan High School (1A), "Cavaliers"
South Davidson High School (1A), "Wildcats"
Thomasville High School(1A) "Bulldogs"

Mid-Carolina
Schools located in Chatham and Moore counties
Bartlett Yancey High School (2A), "Buccaneers"
Hugh M. Cummings High School (2A), "Cavaliers"
Graham High School (2A), "Red Devils"
Jordan-Matthews High School (2A), "Jets"
Seaforth High School (2A), "Hawks"
Chatham Central High School (1A), "Bears"
North Moore High School (1A), Mustangs"

Piedmont Athletic
Schools located in Randolph County
Providence Grove High School (2A), "Patriots"
Randleman High School (2A), "Tigers"
Southwestern Randolph High School (2A), "Cougars"
Trinity High School (2A), "Bulldogs"
Wheatmore High School (2A), "Warriors"
Eastern Randolph High School (1A), "Wildcats"
Uwharrie Charter Academy (1A), "Eagles"

Southern Piedmont
Schools located in Cleveland and Gaston counties
Burns High School (2A), "Bulldogs"
East Gaston High School (2A), "Warriors"
Shelby High School (2A), "Golden Lions"
Bessemer City High School (1A), "Yellow Jackets"
Cherryville High School (1A), "Ironmen"
Highland School of Technology (1A), "Rams"
Thomas Jefferson Academy (1A), "Gryphons"

Super Six
Schools located in the Triangle region
Franklin Academy (2A), "Patriots"
North Carolina School of Science and Mathematics (2A), "Unicorns"
Raleigh Charter High School (2A), "Phoenix"
Research Triangle High School (2A), "Raptors"
East Wake Academy (1A), "Eagles"
Falls Lake Academy (1A), "Firebirds"

Waccamaw
Schools located in the southeastern portion of the state
South Columbus High School (2A), "Stallions"
Heide Trask High School (2A), "Titans"
Whiteville High School (2A), "Wolfpack"
East Columbus High School (1A), "Gators"
Pender High School (1A), "Patriots"
West Columbus High School (1A), "Vikings"

Western Highlands
Schools located in the western North Carolina mountains
Madison High School (2A), "Patriots"
Charles D. Owen High School (2A), "Warhorses"
Avery County High School (1A), "Vikings"
Draughn High School (1A), "Wildcats"
Mitchell High School (1A), "Mountaineers"
Mountain Heritage High School (1A), "Cougars"
Rosman High School (1A), "Tigers"

Yadkin Valley
Schools located along the Yadkin River in the northwest
Jay M. Robinson High School (2A), "Bulldogs"
Mount Pleasant High School (2A), "Tigers"
North Stanly High School (2A), "Comets"
Albemarle High School (1A), "Bulldogs"
Gray Stone Day School (1A), "Knights"
South Stanly High School (1A), "Rebels"
Union Academy, "Cardinals"

1A

Atlantic 5
Schools located in the Outer Banks region
Bear Grass Charter School, "Bears"
Cape Hatteras Secondary School, "Hurricanes"
Columbia High School, "Wildcats"
Mattamuskeet High School, "Lakers"
Ocracoke High School, "Dolphins"

Carolina
Schools located in the east central part of the state
Hobbton High School, "Wildcats"
Lakewood High School, "Leopards"
Neuse Charter School, "Cougars"
North Duplin High School, "Rebels"
Rosewood High School, "Eagles"
Union High School, "Spartans"

Central Tar Heel
Schools located in the southern Triangle region
Chatham Charter High School, "Knights"
Clover Garden School, "Grizzlies"
River Mill Academy, "Jaguars"
Woods Charter School, "Wolves"
Southern Wake Academy, "Lions"
Triangle Math and Science Academy, "Tigers"

Four Rivers
Schools located in northeastern North Carolina
Bertie High School, "Falcons"
Gates County Senior High School, "Red Barons"
North East Carolina Preparatory School, "Huskies"
Perquimans County High School, "Pirates"
Riverside High School (Williamston), "Knights"
South Creek High School, "Cougars"
Tarboro High School, "Vikings"
Washington County High School, "Panthers"

Metro 8
Schools located in the Metrolina region
Apprentice Academy, "Wolfpack"
Bradford Prep High School, "Bears"
Cabarrus Charter Academy, "Huskies"
Carolina International School, "Comets"
Corvian Community School, "Cardinals"
Piedmont Communuity Charter School, "Patriots"
Queen's Grant High School, "Stallions"
Sugar Creek Charter School, "Wildcats"

Northwest
Schools located in the northwestern corner of the state
Alleghany High School, "Trojans"
East Wilkes High School (1A), "Cardinals"
Elkin High School (1A), "Elks"
Mount Airy High School, "Granite Bears"
North Stokes High School, "Vikings"
South Stokes High School, "Sauras"
Starmount High School, "Rams"

Northwest Piedmont
Schools located in the Triad region
Bethany Community School, "Wolves"
Bishop McGuinness High School, "Villains"
Carver High School, "Yellowjackets"
Cornerstone Charter Academy, "Cardinals"
Millennium Charter Academy, "Lions"
North Carolina Leadership Academy, "Falcons"
Winston-Salem Preparatory Academy, "Phoenix"

Tar Roanoke
Schools along the Tar and Roanoke rivers
KIPP Pride High School, "Panthers"
North Edgecombe High School, "Warriors"
Northampton County High School, "Jaguars"
Northwest Halifax High School, "Vikings"
Rocky Mount Prep, "Jaguars"
Southeast Halifax High School, "Trojans"
Warren County High School, "Eagles"
Weldon High School, "Chargers"
Wilson Preparatory Academy, "Tigers"

Triangle North
Schools located in the northern Triangle region
Eno River Academy, "Bobcats"
Henderson Collegiate School, "Lions"
Oxford Preparatory School, "Griffins"
Roxboro Community School, "Bulldogs"
Vance Charter School, "Knights"
Voyager Academy, "Vikings"

Smoky Mountain
Schools located in and around the Smoky Mountains
Andrews High School, "Wildcats"
Blue Ridge School, "Bobcats"
Cherokee High School, "Braves"
Hayesville High School, "Yellow Jackets"
Highlands School,  "Highlanders"
Hiwassee Dam High School, "Eagles"
Murphy High School, "Bulldogs"
Nantahala School, "Hawks"
Robbinsville High School, "Black Knights"
Swain County High School, "Maroon Devils"
Tri-County Early College, "Jaguars"

Independent
Ascend Leadership Academy, "Aviators"
Eastern North Carolina School for the Deaf, "Hornets"
North Carolina School for the Deaf, "Bears"

Awards

Commissioner’s Cup
Awarded to NCHSAA teams and athletic programs that highlight community service. Teams identify a community need, host a service project, and host a service project to meet that need.

NCHSAA Athlete of the Year
The NCHSAA Athlete of the Year Award is awarded annually to a nominated male and female high school athlete in North Carolina, who have demonstrated success in multiple different sports. Winners of this award earn the Pat Best Memorial Trophy, named after the late Pat Best, who was a former principal at Goldsboro High School and president of the NCHSAA at the time of his death in 1988.

Hall of Fame
The North Carolina High School Sports Hall of Fame is the hall of fame for high school athletics in North Carolina. It is administered by the NCHSAA and includes athletes, coaches, officials, broadcasters and others who have supported high school athletics in the state. The hall was created in 1987 with Bob Jamieson of Greensboro, Leon Brogden of Wilmington, and Dave Harris of Charlotte as charter members.

References

External links
 
 http://www.nchsbeach.org/

High school sports associations in the United States
Sports organizations established in 1912
1912 establishments in North Carolina